São Miguel do Guaporé is a municipality located in the Brazilian state of Rondônia. Its population was 23,077 (2020) and its area is 7,460 km².

References

Municipalities in Rondônia